Phytoecia angusterufonotata is a species of beetle in the family Cerambycidae. It was described by Maurice Pic in 1952. It is known from Greece. It feeds on Anchusa hybrida.

References

Phytoecia
Beetles described in 1952